Luis López Tosar (born 13 October 1971) is a Spanish actor and musician from Galicia. He is one of the most recognizable and versatile actors in Spain, best known for performances in films such as Cell 211, Take My Eyes, Sleep Tight, Even the Rain, and Mondays in the Sun. He has a music group called "Di Elas".

Early life and career

He began his career playing theater and shorts, but he became famous in Galicia by his performance in 1998 TV Series Mareas Vivas (Televisión de Galicia). Critically acclaimed for his supporting role in the unemployment drama Mondays in the Sun, abusive husband in Take My Eyes, an executive producer in Even the Rain, and doorman in Sleep Tight, his most acclaimed performance has to be from his 2009 hit Cell 211 which stars Tosar as Malamadre, a prisoner that instigates a riot and befriends an undercover prison guard in the process.  His only major role in an American film was Michael Mann's Miami Vice (2006), starring Colin Farrell and Jamie Foxx. Besides that he has appeared in other English films The Limits of Control and Mr. Nice.

In 2012 he dubbed George Washington for the videogame Assassin's Creed III.

On 17 November 2018 he received a star in Almeria Walk of Fame for the films El Niño (2014) and Toro (2016).

Filmography

Film

Television

Accolades 
Tosar won the Málaga Lifetime Achievement Award at the 2011 Málaga Spanish Film Festival.

Celda 211 (Cell 211) (2009)

2010 Cinema Writers Circle Awards, Spain
Best Actor (Mejor Actor)
2010 Fotogramas de Plata
Best Movie Actor (Mejor Actor de Cine)
2010 Premios ACE
Cinema - Best Actor
2010 Seattle International Film Festival
Best Actor

Te doy mis ojos (Take My Eyes) (2003)

2005 Cartagena Film Festival
Best Actor (Mejor Actor)
2004 Cinema Writers Circle Awards, Spain
Best Actor (Mejor Actor) for: Take My Eyes (2003) and The Weakness of the Bolshevik (2003)
2004 Copenhagen International Film Festival
Best Actor
2004 Fotogramas de Plata
Best Movie Actor (Mejor Actor de Cine)
2003 San Sebastián International Film Festival
Best Actor
2004 Seattle International Film Festival
Best Actor
2004 Spanish Actors Union
Lead Performance, Male (Protagonista Cine - Categoría Masculina)
2004 Turia Awards
Best Actor

Los lunes al sol (Mondays in the Sun) (2002)
2003 Cinema Writers Circle Awards, Spain
Best Supporting Actor (Mejor Actor Secundario)
2003 Sant Jordi Awards
Best Spanish Actor (Mejor Actor Español)

References

External links

1971 births
Living people
People from Lugo
Male actors from Galicia (Spain)
Spanish male film actors
Best Supporting Actor Goya Award winners
21st-century Spanish male actors
Spanish male television actors